Kenny Thomas (born 12 September 1968, Islington, London) is an English soul singer who had a successful solo career in the 1990s with eight UK top 40 singles and two UK top ten albums.

Personal life
Thomas grew up on Hillside Estate, Stamford Hill and attended Cardinal Pole Roman Catholic School in Hackney. He was a boxer and a BT technician before embarking on a career as a professional singer. He now lives in Costessey near Norwich.

Career

Breakthrough and debut album
Thomas's breakthrough came in 1991 with his debut hit "Outstanding", a cover of the Gap Band song, which went to number 12 on the UK Singles Chart.

He succeeded in having three singles in the UK chart that year including his biggest hit in July, "Thinking About Your Love", which peaked at number four and stayed on the chart for 13 weeks, and "Best of You", which peaked at number 11 and was in the chart for seven weeks. The former hit was produced by Tim Lever and Mike Percy, formerly of the band Dead or Alive. Thomas's debut album Voices (1991) reached number three on the UK Albums Chart, selling over 300,000 copies.

In February 1992 at the annual BRIT Awards, Thomas was nominated for an award in two categories, Best British Male Vocalist and Best British Newcomer.

Second album and further singles
His second album Wait for Me, released in 1993, was produced by Ian Green and included contributions from Nu Colours and the Young Disciples, and made number 10 in the UK Albums Chart. The lead single from the album, "Trippin' on Your Love", originally recorded by the Staple Singers, made number 17 in the UK Singles Chart.

Later career
Thomas's career enjoyed a brief revival in 2005, when he took part in the televised singing contest on ITV's Hit Me Baby One More Time. He was joined by other one time big pop stars including Shakin' Stevens and Shalamar; the show was eventually won by Stevens.

Thomas supported Level 42 on their Autumn 2006 tour of the UK. July 2006 also saw the release of a new studio album called Crazy World. In 2010, Thomas completed three years of study graduating with a Bachelor of Science degree in Acupuncture & Oriental Medicine and is now a qualified practitioner. He released a new album, Breathe, in September 2011. Producers on the album include the UK-based Mark Jaimes & Danny Saxon, 5AM, Sir Piers and the Drizabone Soul Family.

Thomas's latest album and project was 2013's The Thomas Brown Affair. It is a collaboration with hit songwriter, producer and jazz pianist Wayne Brown who has worked with a diverse array of international artists. The album is a collection of classic songs "performed in their own personal and unique style".

In 2016, Thomas became the lead singer of the band Living in a Box after they reformed, replacing Richard Darbyshire.

Discography

Albums

Singles

References

External links
 

1968 births
Living people
English pop singers
English male singers
English soul singers
British contemporary R&B singers
Singers from London
People from Islington (district)
People from Stamford Hill
British Telecom people
People from Costessey